Dodging the Dole is a 1936 British musical comedy film directed by John E. Blakeley and starring Roy Barbour, Dan Young and Jenny Howard. It was made by Mancunian Films at Highbury Studios and Southall Studios.

Synopsis
An exasperated clerk at a labour exchange tries to find jobs for two idle scroungers.

Cast
 Roy Barbour - The Simplicity of Genius 
 Dan Young - The Charming Fool 
 Jenny Howard - The Generator of Electric Radiance 
 Barry K. Barnes - The Dole Dodger 
 Fred Walmsley - The Lancashire Favourite 
 Tot Sloan - The Little Bundle of Fun 
 Bertha Ricardo - Dainty and Demure

References

Bibliography
 Low, Rachael. Filmmaking in 1930s Britain. George Allen & Unwin, 1985.
 Wood, Linda. British Films, 1927-1939. British Film Institute, 1986.

External links

1936 films
1936 musical comedy films
British musical comedy films
Films directed by John E. Blakeley
Films shot at Highbury Studios
Films shot at Southall Studios
Films set in England
British black-and-white films
Films shot in Greater Manchester
1930s English-language films
1930s British films